Backer board may refer to:
 Cement board used as tile backer board (to support tiles)
 Cardboard used in the conservation of comic books to keep pages flat